Pecos National Historical Park is a United States National Historical Park in San Miguel County, New Mexico. The park, operated by the National Park Service, encompasses thousands of acres of landscape infused with historical elements from prehistoric archaeological ruins to 19th-century ranches, to a battlefield of the American Civil War.  Its largest single feature is Pecos Pueblo also known as Cicuye Pueblo, a Native American community abandoned in historic times.  First a state monument in 1935, it was made Pecos National Monument in 1965, and greatly enlarged and renamed in 1990.  Two sites within the park, the pueblo and the Glorieta Pass Battlefield, are National Historic Landmarks.

Features

Pecos Pueblo
The main unit of the park preserves the ruins of Pecos Pueblo, known historically as Cicuye (sometimes spelled Ciquique), the "village of 500 warriors".  The first Pecos pueblo was one of two dozen rock-and-mud villages built in the valley around AD 1100 in the prehistoric Pueblo II Era.  Within 350 years the Pueblo IV Era Pecos village had grown to house more than 2,000 people in its five-storied complex.

The people who lived at Cicuye/Pecos Pueblo spoke the Towa language. The Pecos people enjoyed a rich culture with inventive architecture and beautiful crafts. They also possessed an elaborate religious life, evidenced by the remains of over 20 ceremonial subterranean kivas. Some of the kivas have diameters as large as 40 feet and are 10 feet deep, accessed by wooden ladders. Farming was a main part of their diet and staple crops included the usual beans, corn, and squash. Their location, power and ability to supply goods made the Pecos a major trade center in the eastern part of the Puebloan territory, connecting the Pueblos to the Plains cultures such as the Comanche. There are seven distinct periods of their occupancy beginning with the Preceramic Period (11,500 B.C.E. - 600 C.E.) Ancestral Puebloan Paleo-Indians, and ending in the 1830s when the last remaining Pueblo people migrated to Jemez Pueblo where the people also spoke the Towa language.

The historical Pecos people produced, used or traded seven types of ceramic ware during their occupancy of the area. These are known as Rio Grande Greyware (plain and corrugated), Pajarito White Ware, Rio Grande Glaze Ware, Historic polychromes, Historic plain ware, White Mountain Red Ware, and Plains Apache Ware. Many of these were decorated with black, red or polychrome designs.

Spanish mission

The main unit of the park also protects the remains of Mission Nuestra Señora de los Ángeles de Porciúncula de los Pecos, a Spanish mission near the pueblo built in the early 17th century. A  self-guiding trail begins at the nearby visitor center and winds through the ruins of Pecos Pueblo and the mission church.

Pecos was visited by expeditionaries with Francisco Vásquez de Coronado in 1540. The Spanish mission church was built in 1619. A traditional kiva was built in front of the church during the Pueblo Revolt in 1680 as a rejection of the Christian religion brought by Spanish colonists. However when the Spanish returned in 1692, the Pecos community stayed on friendly terms with them, and a new, smaller church was built in 1717. The site was abandoned in 1838, after the Pecos population suffered from marauding Comanches. The surviving remnant of the Pecos population moved to the Jemez Pueblo.

Forked Lightning Ranch
Another part of the park is the Forked Lightning Ranch, a cattle ranch established in the 1920s by Tex Austin, a famous producer of rodeos.  It was headquartered at the Kozlowski's Stage Stop and Tavern, a stagecoach stop on the Santa Fe Trail that had also served as a Union forces encampment before the Battle of Glorieta Pass.  It was only a cattle ranch for a time before Austin converted it into a dude ranch which he promoted to Easterners. The main ranch was designed by John Gaw Meem in the Pueblo Revival style of architecture.  Austin's heavily mortgaged endeavour failed, closing in 1933.  In 1936 the ranch again became a working cattle ranch, and in 1941 it was purchased by Buddy Fogelson, a Texas oilman who married actress Greer Garson. After her husband died, Garson sold her share of the park in 1991 to a conservation group, which donated it to the Park Service.

Old Santa Fe Trail

Portions of the historic Santa Fe Trail run through all units of the park.  This rutted wagon trail was one of the major routes by which the American Southwest grew in the 19th century.

Glorieta Pass Battlefield

The Battle of Glorieta Pass was fought March 26–28, 1862 in the mountain pass west of Pecos Pueblo, along the route of the Old Santa Fe Trail.  Confederate forces were en route to take Union-controlled Fort Union, and were fought to a standoff by militia raised in the New Mexico and Colorado Territories.  Although parts of the battlefield have been compromised by highway construction, two sections of the battlefield have been preserved by the Park Service on either side of the pass.  Public access to these units is limited by the National Park Service.

Administrative history
In 1965, President Lyndon Johnson established Pecos National Monument over the same area, and control was turned over the Park Service. The two units of the Glorieta Pass Battlefield were formally added to the park in 1993.

See also 

Hispanic Heritage Site
National Register of Historic Places listings in San Miguel County, New Mexico
National Register of Historic Places listings in Santa Fe County, New Mexico
List of National Historic Landmarks in New Mexico
List of National Monuments of the United States
List of National Historical Parks

References

External links

National Park Service: Pecos National Historical Park
Pecos Conference
American Southwest, a National Park Service Discover Our Shared Heritage Travel Itinerary
Pecos Pueblo animation

Archaeological sites in New Mexico
Archaeological sites on the National Register of Historic Places in New Mexico
National Historical Parks in New Mexico
National Historic Landmarks in New Mexico
Ruins in the United States
Museums in San Miguel County, New Mexico
Protected areas established in 1965
Historic house museums in New Mexico
Native American museums in New Mexico
National Park Service areas in New Mexico
Parks in San Miguel County, New Mexico
Parks in Santa Fe County, New Mexico
National Register of Historic Places in San Miguel County, New Mexico
National Register of Historic Places in Santa Fe County, New Mexico
National Historical Parks of the United States